Petar Kolev (born 26 June 1984) is a Bulgarian footballer who currently plays as a forward for Karnobat.

References

1984 births
Living people
Bulgarian footballers
First Professional Football League (Bulgaria) players
FC Chernomorets Burgas players
PFC Slavia Sofia players
OFC Sliven 2000 players
FC Pomorie players
PFC Nesebar players
Neftochimic Burgas players
FC Sozopol players

Association football forwards